Satellite Town is a populated place and a town in Jhang city in the Punjab, Pakistan. It is located at the coordinates 31°15'36"N and 72°21'2"E.

References 

Populated places in Jhang District